Kadenia dubia is a species of flowering plant belonging to the family Apiaceae.

Its native range is Europe to Siberia and Kazakhstan.

Synonym:
 Cnidium dubium (Schkuhr) Schmeil & Fitschen

References

Apioideae